Rotterdam Lombardijen is a railway station in the Dutch city of Rotterdam, located on the Breda–Rotterdam railway between Rotterdam and Dordrecht. The railway station is located in the borough of IJsselmonde. The station opened on 1 June 1964 with wooden platforms and no more than a trailer for ticket sales. On 12 September 1968 a station building was opened; the current station building dates from 1996. Train services are operated by Nederlandse Spoorwegen.

Train services
The following services call at Rotterdam Lombardijen:
4x per hour local service (sprinter) The Hague - Rotterdam - Dordrecht

Bus & tram services

Several Rotterdam tram and bus lines call at the Rotterdam Lombardijen station. A tram stop is located just east of the station, where RET-lines 2 and 20 stop.

2 Charlois - Maashaven - Lombardijen - Keizerswaard
20 Rotterdam Centraal - Eendrachtsplein - Laan van Zuid - Feijenoord - Lombardijen
70 Charlois - Zuidplein - Slinge - Lombardijen - Keizerswaard
76 Zuidplein - Vreewijk - Lombardijen - Keizerswaard
92 Zuidplein - Lombardijen - Hendrik-Ido-Ambacht - Zwijndrecht - Dordrecht
143 Zuidplein - Lombardijen - Keizerswaard - P&R Beverwaard - Ridderkerk - Dordrecht
144 Zuidplein - Lombardijen - Keizerswaard - P&R Beverwaard - Bolnes - Slikkerveer - Ridderkerk
163 Lombardijen - Heinenoord - Oud Beijerland
183 Kralingse Zoom - Keizerswaard - Lombardijen - Barendrecht - Rhoon Portland - Zuidplein
191 Zuidplein - Lombardijen - Papendrecht - Sliedrecht
192 Zuidplein - Lombardijen - Rijsoord - Hendrik-Ido-Ambacht - Zwijndrecht - Dordrecht
283 Kralingse Zoom - Keizerswaard - Lombardijen - Barendrecht - Rhoon Portland - Zuidplein
663 Lombardijen - Heinenoord - Oud Beijerland - Piershil - Goudswaard

!colspan=2|Previous!!Line!!colspan=2|Next

External links
NS website 
Dutch Public Transport journey planner 

Lombardijen
Railway stations opened in 1964
Railway stations on the Staatslijn I